Marc Zellweger (born 17 October 1973) is a Swiss former professional football defender. He spent his most playing career at FC St. Gallen.

External links
 
 Marc Zellweger at Football.ch 
 

Living people
1973 births
Association football defenders
Swiss men's footballers
Switzerland international footballers
1. FC Köln players
FC Wil players
FC St. Gallen players
Bundesliga players
Swiss Super League players
Swiss Challenge League players
Swiss expatriate footballers
Expatriate footballers in Germany
Swiss expatriate sportspeople in Germany
People from Winterthur
Sportspeople from the canton of Zürich